Eastern Bank Limited is a private commercial bank headquartered in Dhaka, Bangladesh. It was established on August 8, 1992, as a public limited company with limited liability under the Bank Companies Act of 1991. Its share are listed in the Dhaka Stock Exchange and the Chittagong Stock Exchange. The bank provides products and services in retail banking, corporate finance, asset management, equity brokerage and security. It has 85 branches and 214 ATMs in Bangladesh and employs around 3000 employees.

Eastern Bank Limited is going to open its first overseas full-fledged branch in Calcutta, India. This branch in India will be its first foreign branch outside of Bangladesh. Presently, EBL has a subsidiary in Hong Kong named EBL Finance (HK) Limited and a representative office in Myanmar. EBL opened its third representative office on the Chinese mainland in Guangzhou on September 29, 2019.

History
Eastern Bank Limited began operations on August 16, 1992. Prior to 1992 EBL operated as BCCI, which transformed into Eastern Bank Limited. which is located in Bangladesh.

Composition of the Group EBL 
As of 2018, the group is composed of Eastern Bank Limited, the separate business unit Off-Shore Banking Unit (OBU), and five wholly owned subsidiaries:
 EBL Securities Limited (stock dealing & brokerage)
 EBL Investments Limited (merchant banking operations)
 EBL Asset Management Limited (asset management)
 EBL Finance (HK) Limited (first foreign subsidiary doing trade finance and off-shore banking business in Hong Kong)
 Yangon Representative Office, Myanmar
 Guangzhou Representative Office, Mainland China

Board of Directors 
 Md. Showkat Ali Chowdhury (Chairman)
 M. Ghaziul Haque
 A. M. Shaukat Ali (not at present)
 Mir Nasir Hossain
 Salina Ali
 Anis Ahmed
 Meah Mohammed Abdur Rahim (not at present)
 Mufakkharul Islam Khasru
 Ormaan Rafay Nizam (not at present)
 Gazi Md. Shawkat Hossain
 K J S Banu
 Zara Namreen
 Ali Reza Iftekhar (MD & CEO)

Shareholding pattern 
As of September 30, 2019:

See also

 List of Banks in Bangladesh

References

External links
 Official website
 Internship Report On Strategy of Eastern Bank Limited

Banks of Bangladesh
Companies listed on the Dhaka Stock Exchange
Banks established in 1992
Organisations based in Motijheel
Bangladeshi companies established in 1992